Tzum is a village in the Netherlands.

TSUM may refer to:
 TsUM (Moscow), a Russian department store
 TZUM (Sofia), a Bulgarian department store

See also 
 Tsum (disambiguation)